Maor Kandil (born ) is an Israeli footballer who plays for Maccabi Tel Aviv.

Early life
Kandil was born in Tel Aviv, Israel, to a Sephardic Jewish family.

Club career
He made his Israeli Premier League debut for Bnei Yehuda Tel Aviv on 22 August 2015, in a game against Maccabi Haifa.

Honours

Club
Bnei Yehuda
 Israel State Cup: 2016–17

Maccabi Tel Aviv
 Israeli Premier League (2): 2018–19, 2019-20
 Toto Cup (2): 2018–19, 2020-21
 Israel Super Cup (2): 2019, 2020

References

External links
 

1993 births
Living people
Israeli footballers
Israeli Sephardi Jews
Israel international footballers
Beitar Tel Aviv Bat Yam F.C. players
Bnei Yehuda Tel Aviv F.C. players
Maccabi Jaffa F.C. players
Hapoel Nir Ramat HaSharon F.C. players
Maccabi Tel Aviv F.C. players
Liga Leumit players
Israeli Premier League players
Footballers from Tel Aviv
Association football fullbacks